Black Coffee is a 2014 American romantic comedy film directed by Mark Harris, starring Darrin Henson, Christian Keyes, Lamman Rucker, Gabrielle Dennis and Erica Hubbard.

Cast
 Darrin Henson as Robert
 Christian Keyes as Julian
 Lamman Rucker as Hill
 Gabrielle Dennis as Morgan
 Erica Hubbard as Mita
 Josh Ventura as Nate
 Richard Gallion as Duke

Release
The film was released on 10 January 2014.

Reception
The Hollywood Reporter wrote that while the film "may not be good to the last drop", it "has its heart in the right place", and "offers some pleasurable jolts along the way". Film critic Kam Williams called the film a "pat, if unconvincing, romantic romp determined to march inexorably to an implausible, happily ever after finale, whether you like it or not." Sheila O'Malley of RogerEbert.com rated the film 1.5 stars out of 4 and wrote that while the film "means well" and has "some interesting and exciting ideas, and a couple of funny lines", it is "too big of a mess". Geoff Berkshire of Variety wrote that while most of the cast "generally struggles to elevate the one-note roles", Henson "musters up enough leading man charm to carry the drama’s light weight load."

Brent Simon of Paste gave the film a rating of 4/10 and wrote that the film is "too shot through with trite expressions of familiar scenarios, and weighed down by a phony redemption and catharsis pegged to its significantly boorish significant others, to connect in any meaningful way", and called it a "cheap, tepid store-brand blend, of dubious quality." David Noh of Film Journal International wrote that "uniformly attractive cast are in there at all times, valiantly pitching away, but are mostly sunk by Harris' thuddingly banal notions", while "Dennis' sharp intelligence manages to occasionally gleam through all the glib mediocrity." Tracy Moore of Common Sense Media rated the film 2 stars out of 5 and called it "middling".

References

External links
 
 

American romantic comedy films
2014 romantic comedy films